The 81st District of the Iowa House of Representatives in the state of Iowa.

Current elected officials
Luana Stoltenberg is the representative currently representing the district.

Past representatives
The district has previously been represented by:
 William H. Harbor, 1971–1973
 Gregory D. Cusack, 1973–1981
 Thomas H. Fey, 1981–1983
 Ned Chiodo, 1983–1985
 Jack Hatch, 1985–1993
 Jack Drake, 1993–2003
 Jamie Van Fossen, 2003–2009
 Phyllis Thede, 2009–2013
 Mary Gaskill, 2013–2021
 Cherielynn Westrich, 2021–2023
 Luana Stoltenberg, 2023–Present

References

081